The Yamaha YZR500 was a for 500cc Grand Prix racing motorcycle made by Yamaha from 1973 through 2002.

Racing history

The YZR500 was ridden by championship winners Giacomo Agostini (1975), Kenny Roberts (1978, 1979, 1980), Eddie Lawson (1984, 1986, 1988) and Wayne Rainey (1990, 1991, 1992).

Phillip McCallen won the Macau Grand Prix in 1996.

Chronology

See also 

Honda NSR500
Aprilia RSW-2 500
Cagiva C593
Suzuki RGV500
ELF 500 ROC
Sabre V4

Notes

External links
Official Yamaha page for the history of the YZR500 

Yamaha motorcycles
Grand Prix motorcycles
Motorcycles introduced in 1973
Two-stroke motorcycles